Al Wigh  is a small desert oasis airfield located in the Sahara Desert, army outpost and military base in the Fezzan region of southwest Libya. It is about 975 kilometres south of the country's capital, Tripoli, and about 500 kilometres to the Niger-Chad border.

The base was the site of several small confrontations in the Southern Libyan Desert campaign in the 2011 Libyan civil war between rebel anti-Gaddafi forces (mainly Toubou tribesmen) and loyalist pro-Gaddafi forces.

References

Populated places in Murzuq District
Oases of Libya